Sir Frederic Gorell Barnes, JP, DL, FRGS (1856 – 17 March 1939) was a British barrister and politician.

A first cousin of the judge Lord Gorell, he was born in Mossley Hill, Barnes was educated at the Royal Institution of Liverpool and Jesus College, Cambridge. He was called to the bar at the Inner Temple in 1885 and joined the Northern Circuit. He also became a Justice of the Peace, a deputy lieutenant of Kent, and a Fellow of the Royal Geographical Society.

Barnes stood unsuccessfully for the Conservative Party in North East Derbyshire at the 1892 UK general election, then won Faversham at the 1895 UK general election. He did not contest any seat at the 1900 UK general election, but stood unsuccessfully in Northampton at the 1906 and January 1910 general elections.

Barnes was awarded a knighthood in 1916, and from 1917 to 1921 worked for the Ministry of Food. He also served as a vice president of the Tariff Reform League.

References

1856 births
1939 deaths
UK MPs 1895–1900
Members of the Middle Temple
Alumni of Jesus College, Cambridge
English justices of the peace
Deputy Lieutenants of Kent
Fellows of the Royal Geographical Society
Knights Bachelor
Conservative Party (UK) MPs for English constituencies